The Kids Tonight Show is an American late-night talk show for children that premiered on Peacock on October 14, 2021. The series is hosted by Recker Eans, Dylan Gilmer, Mykal-Michelle Harris, and Olivia Perez. On the show, it is referred as "the first talk show for kids by kids" and is based on the long-running late-night talk show The Tonight Show.

Episodes

Production

References

External links
 
 NBC
 

2020s American children's comedy television series
2020s American late-night television series
2020s American television talk shows
2020s American variety television series
2021 American television series debuts
2021 American television series endings
American television spin-offs
English-language television shows
Jimmy Fallon
NBC original programming
Television series about children
Television series by Broadway Video
Television series by Universal Television
Television shows filmed in New York City